The Trenchard Museum is based at RAF Halton, Halton, Buckinghamshire, England. The overall aim of the museum is to preserve and display items that relate to the early history of the Royal Air Force, particularly the training of apprentices that took place at RAF Halton. It is named after Lord Trenchard, who is known as the father of the Royal Air Force, founded the aircraft apprentice scheme, and had a strong association with RAF Halton. The museum was opened in 1999.

Collection and activities
The collection celebrates the history of RAF Halton, the origins of which go back to 1913 when the Royal Flying Corps were given permission by the then owner Alfred de Rothschild to use his estate at Halton for practicing manoeuvres. There are important exhibits recounting the major contribution of Lord Trenchard to the founding and development of the RAF, some of which were originally housed in a small museum in his name at RAF Upavon. The museum also records the background to apprentice training at the Halton camp through examples of the tools, work and test pieces completed by apprentices, and the exploits of some of those who were trained there. The museum has two complete aircraft, many models of aircraft, a number of aero engines, weapons and other equipment on display. There are a large number of photographs, a mock up of barrack rooms, and the uniforms worn by those stationed at Halton Camp over the years. Aside from artefacts relating to engineering, there is also memorabilia relating to a wide range of other training, including catering, nursing and dentistry.

Management and funding
The Trenchard Museum was opened on 22 June 1999 by Hugh Trenchard, 3rd Viscount Trenchard, the grandson of Hugh Trenchard. The museum is managed by a curator, assisted by a small number of volunteers who have previous experience based at the Halton Camp or have an interest in the activities of RAF Halton. Funding of the museum is from small grants and through the supply of exhibits and other materials from the RAF. Many apprentice training artifacts have been loaned or donated by past apprentices, Financial support also comes via contributions from visitors and through educational activities.  The museum is normally open on Wednesdays and for groups at other times by prior arrangement.

References

 Museums in Buckinghamshire
Museums established in 1999
Military aviation museums in England
1999 establishments in England